Venus Mind Trap is an EP by Deathline International, released on April 16, 1995 by COP International.

Track listing

Personnel
Adapted from the Venus Mind Trap liner notes.

Deathline International
 Shawn Brice (as Wiz Art) – vocals, producer, engineering
 Christian Petke (as Count Zero) – vocals, producer, engineering, cover art

Additional performers
 John Carson – bass guitar
 Rey Osburn – guitar, backing vocals
 Suzanne Santos – vocals
 Evan Sornstein (Curium Design) – saxophone, cover art

Production and design
 Gunnar Seeling – photography

Release history

References

External links 
 Venus Mind Trap at Discogs (list of releases)
 Venus Mind Trap at iTunes

1995 EPs
Deathline International albums
COP International EPs